The 2022–23 Big Ten men's basketball season is the season for Big Ten Conference basketball teams that began with practices in October 2022, followed by the start of the 2022–23 NCAA Division I men's basketball season in November 2022. The regular season will end in March 2023.

With Northwestern's loss to Maryland on February 26, 2023, Purdue clinched a share of the Big Ten regular season championship. With Michigan's loss to Illinois on March 2, Purdue clinched the outright regular season championship, its first outright championship since 2017. The championship marked the school's 25th, the most in Big Ten history.

Purdue center Zach Edey was named Big Ten Player of the Year. Northwestern coach Chris Collins (basketball) was named Big Ten Coach of the Year.

The Big Ten tournament was held March 8 through March 12 at United Center in Chicago, Illinois. Purdue defeated Penn State in the championship game. 

In addition to Purdue, who received the conference's automatic bid to the NCAA tournament, the conference had eight teams received bids to the tournament: Illinois, Indiana, Iowa, Maryland, Michigan State, Northwestern, and Penn State. 

Three schools also received invitations to the National Invitation Tournament: Michigan, Rutgers, and Wisconsin.

Head coaches

Coaching changes

Maryland 
On December 3, 2021, Maryland and Mark Turgeon agreed to part ways effective immediately. Assistant coach Danny Manning was named interim coach for the remainder of the season. Following the season, the school named Seton Hall coach Kevin Willard the team's new head coach.

Coaches 

Notes:
 All records, appearances, titles, etc. are from time with current school only.
 Year at school includes 2022–23 season.
 Overall and Big Ten records are from time at current school only and are through the beginning of the season.

Preseason

Preseason Big Ten poll 
Prior to the conference's annual media day, unofficial awards and a poll were chosen by a panel of writers.

Preseason All-Big Ten 
Prior to the conference's annual media day, unofficial awards and a poll were chosen by a panel of writers.

Preseason watchlists
Below is a table of notable preseason watch lists.

Preseason national polls

Regular season

Rankings 

 AP does not release a post-tournament poll.

Early season tournaments 
Of the 14 Big Ten teams, 12 participated in early season tournaments. All Big Ten teams participated in the ACC–Big Ten Challenge against Atlantic Coast Conference teams, the 22nd and final year for the event. Eight teams participated in the Gavitt Tipoff Games.

Players of the week
Throughout the conference regular season, the Big Ten offices named one or two players of the week and one or two freshmen of the week each Monday.

Conference matrix
This table summarizes the head-to-head results between teams in conference play. Each team was scheduled to play 20 conference games, and at least one game against each opponent. However, the February 15 game between Michigan State and Minnesota was canceled due to the Michigan State shooting, meaning those teams would only play 19 conference games.

Honors and awards

All-Big Ten awards and teams
On March 7, 2023, the Big Ten announced most of its conference awards.

Postseason

Big Ten tournament

NCAA Tournament

The winner of the Big Ten Tournament, Purdue, received the conference's automatic bid to the NCAA tournament. Eight Big Ten teams received bids to the NCAA tournament, tied with the SEC for the most of any conference in the tournament.

National Invitation Tournament

Three Big Ten teams received invitations to the National Invitation Tournament.

References